There are several lighthouses in the U.S. state of California, including a few listed on the National Register of Historic Places.

Lighthouse Friends (California)

Notable Faux Lighthouse

Notes
A. Ballast Point Light was moved in 1960 to the bell tower which had served as a fog signal building as the 1890 tower had been declared unsafe. The light shone from the top of the bell tower until 1961 when it was replaced by an offshore light.
B. The tower was abandoned in 1971 when the beacon was moved to a nearby modern pole. This light was discontinued in 2013 fifteen years after the old tower was moved to a new spot and restored. 
C. Parts of the old structure now have separate owners, today an automated beacon is in active service.
D. Light moved to a pole.
E. Old Point Loma Light was built a few months after the lighthouse at Point Pinos making it the second oldest in the state still standing.

References

Lighthouses
 
Lighthouses
California